Joseph Ujlaki (10 August 1929 – 13 February 2006) was a French footballer of Hungarian descent, one of the best strikers in Division 1 (190 goals) in the 1950s and 1960s.

Titles
Nice
 Division 1: 1956
 French Cup: 1954

References

External links
 Profile
 
Profile - FC Metz

1929 births
2006 deaths
Footballers from Budapest
French people of Hungarian descent
Association football forwards
Hungarian footballers
French footballers
France international footballers
Ligue 1 players
Stade Français (association football) players
FC Sète 34 players
Nîmes Olympique players
OGC Nice players
Racing Club de France Football players
FC Metz players
Pays d'Aix FC players